Nõnova is a village in Võru Parish, Võru County, in southeastern Estonia, located about 8 km east of the town of Võru. It has a population of 32 (as of 2011) and an area of 4.1 km².

Nõnova has a station on currently inactive Valga–Pechory railway.

References

Võru Parish
Villages in Võru County